Castronno is a comune (municipality) in the Province of Varese in the Italian region Lombardy, located about  northwest of Milan and about  southwest of Varese.

It is served by Castronno railway station.

History
Little is known about the story of the village even if historians say that the ruins can be dated back to Roman times. 
During the Medieval Age, Castronno was involved in a war between the two cities of Milan and Como.

References

Cities and towns in Lombardy